Kouadio Vincent Aka-Akesse (born October 25, 1975 in N'zi-Comoé, Côte d'Ivoire) is an amateur Ivorian-born French freestyle wrestler, who played for the men's heavyweight category. In 2005, Aka-Akesse had won two medals for the 96 kg class at the Mediterranean Games in Almería, Spain, and at the European Wrestling Championships in Varna, Bulgaria.

Aka-Akesse made his official debut, as a member of the Ivorian team, for the 2000 Summer Olympics in Sydney, where he competed in the men's 85 kg. He placed last in the preliminary pool, against Iran's Amir Reza Khadem, Romania's Nicolae Ghiţă, and Hungary's Gábor Kapuvári, without receiving a technical point. Shortly after his first Olympics, Aka-Akesse moved from his native country Côte d'Ivoire to Clermont-Ferrand, France, where he had undergone full-time training and developed his skills in wrestling at AS Montferrand, under head coach Thierry Bourdin. He also obtained a French citizenship in order to compete internationally for wrestling.

At the 2004 Summer Olympics in Athens, Aka-Akesse competed this time for the men's 84 kg class, representing his adopted nation France. He finished last again in the preliminary pool match against Greece's Lazaros Loizidis and Georgia's Revaz Mindorashvili, without receiving a technical point.

At the 2008 Summer Olympics in Beijing, Aka-Akesse switched to a heavier class by competing in the men's 96 kg division. He lost the preliminary round of sixteen to Azerbaijan's Khetag Gazyumov, who was able to four points each in two straight periods, leaving Aka-Akesse without a single point.

References

External links
Profile – International Wrestling Database
Profile – French Olympic Committee 
NBC 2008 Olympics profile

Ivorian male sport wrestlers
1975 births
Living people
Olympic wrestlers of France
Olympic wrestlers of Ivory Coast
Wrestlers at the 2000 Summer Olympics
French male sport wrestlers
Wrestlers at the 2004 Summer Olympics
Wrestlers at the 2008 Summer Olympics
French sportspeople of Ivorian descent
Naturalized citizens of France
People from Lacs District
Sportspeople from Clermont-Ferrand
Mediterranean Games silver medalists for France
Competitors at the 2005 Mediterranean Games
Mediterranean Games medalists in wrestling